"Crazy Cool" is a song recorded by American singer Paula Abdul for her third studio album, Head over Heels (1995). It was written by was written by Peter Lord, V. Jeffrey Smith and Sandra St. Victor, while produced by the former two, and was released as the album's second single on August 22, 1995, by Virgin Records.

Critical reception
Steve Baltin from Cash Box wrote, "The second single from Abdul’s Head Over Heels CD is successful when it follows the same slightly dark ambient tones of “My Love Is For Real”, the record’s first single. However, it loses its way during the overly bubbly chorus. Abdul obviously wanted to try something new on this record. Hopefully she learned the valuable lesson for next time of sticking to one’s own guns."

Chart performance
The single reached number 58 on the Billboard Hot 100 and was a hit on the dance charts. In Canada, the single peaked at number 49 and remained on the chart for 15 weeks.

Music video
The accompanying music video for "Crazy Cool" was directed by Matthew Rolston. Originally, MTV said they wouldn't play the video if it wasn't edited into a cleaner version. In the clip, Abdul holds a black cane on and against herself; she also pours a bottle of beer over her breasts while riding a mechanical bull. Rolston and Abdul claimed that it was simply part of the dance and choreography but MTV still said they would not play the clip unless it was edited. In the end, Rolston and Abdul admitted defeat and edited the video.

The "Single Remix Version" was the remix being played as the video version.

Track listings and formats
 US 12" Record
"Crazy Cool" - Bad Boy Bill House Mix (Full version) (Peter Lord; Sandra St. Victor; V. Jeffrey Smith) 6:03
"Crazy Cool" - Strike's Dub (Peter Lord; Sandra St. Victor; V. Jeffrey Smith) 6:41
"Crazy Cool" - Deep Dish's Crazy Cool Remix (Peter Lord; Sandra St. Victor; V. Jeffrey Smith) 11:28
"The Choice Is Yours" - Edit (Arnold Hennings; Debra Killings) 3:56

 US 5" CD Maxi
"Crazy Cool" - Single Remix Version (Peter Lord; Sandra St. Victor; V. Jeffrey Smith) 3:56
"Crazy Cool" - Jeep Mix (Peter Lord; Sandra St. Victor; V. Jeffrey Smith) 3:56
"The Choice Is Yours" - Edit (Arnold Hennings; Debra Killings) 3:57
"Crazy Cool" - Urban Mix (Peter Lord; Sandra St. Victor; V. Jeffrey Smith) 4:05
"Crazy Cool" - Bad Boy Bill House Mix (Peter Lord; Sandra St. Victor; V. Jeffrey Smith) 3:47
"Crazy Cool" - Deep Dish's Crazy Cool Edit (Peter Lord; Sandra St. Victor; V. Jeffrey Smith) 10:42

Official remixes
Single Remix Version 3:56
Urban Mix 4:05
Jeep Mix 3:56
Strike's Dub 6:04
Strike Vocal Mix 6:44
Deep Dish's Crazy Cool Remix 11:28
Bad Boy Bill House Mix 3:47
Bad Boy Bill Dub 4:03
Sharam Crazy Journey Mix 12:39
Lp Version 4:43
Deep Dish's Crazy Cool Edit 10:42

Charts

References

1995 singles
Paula Abdul songs
Songs written by Sandra St. Victor
Music videos directed by Matthew Rolston
Virgin Records singles
1995 songs